Gyromitra fastigiata is a species of fungus in the family Discinaceae. It is related to species containing the toxin monomethylhydrazine, so its consumption is not advised.

References

External links

Discinaceae
Fungi described in 1834
Fungi of Europe